Mythimna sicula is a species of moth of the family Noctuidae. It is found from Morocco to Libya, central and southern Europe, Turkey, Israel, Iran and Turkmenistan.

Adults are on wing year round. There are multiple generations per year.

The larvae feed on various Gramineae species.

External links
Hadeninae of Israel
Lepiforum.de

Mythimna (moth)
Moths of Europe
Moths of Africa
Moths of Asia
Moths described in 1835
Taxa named by Georg Friedrich Treitschke